Abraham Sánchez (born April 11, 1992 in San Luis Potosí City, San Luis Potosí) is a Mexican professional footballer who plays for Celaya on loan from Club Necaxa of Ascenso MX.

External links

References

Liga MX players
Living people
Club Celaya footballers
1992 births
People from San Luis Potosí City
Mexican footballers
Association footballers not categorized by position
21st-century Mexican people